Choi Yong-sin (born 21 May 1978) is a Korean former judoka who competed in the 2000 Summer Olympics.

References

1978 births
Living people
Olympic judoka of South Korea
Judoka at the 2000 Summer Olympics
Judoka at the 2002 Asian Games
Asian Games medalists in judo
Asian Games gold medalists for South Korea
Medalists at the 2002 Asian Games
Yong In University alumni
South Korean male judoka
Universiade medalists in judo
Universiade silver medalists for South Korea
Medalists at the 2001 Summer Universiade